The 2022 Japanese Super Cup (known as FUJIFILM Super Cup 2022 for sponsorship reasons) was the 29th Japanese Super Cup since its reestablishment, and the 37th overall. It was held on 12 February 2022 between the 2021 J1 League champions Kawasaki Frontale, whom also the Super Cup holders, and the 2021 Emperor's Cup winners Urawa Red Diamonds at the Nissan Stadium, Yokohama, Kanagawa.

This was Frontale's fourth Super Cup appearance overall, all in the previous five years; they only failed to qualify in 2020 and won twice in 2019 and 2021. At the other hand, this was Urawa's tenth Super Cup appearance and their first since 2019; they previously had won four times (in 1979, 1980, 1983, and 2006).

Ataru Esaka scored in each half to won Urawa their fifth Super Cup ever, second as Urawa Red Diamonds, and the first in 16 years. Frontale lost the Super Cup match for the first time since their maiden appearance in 2018.

Details

References

Japanese Super Cup
Super
Kawasaki Frontale matches
Urawa Red Diamonds matches